Jo Ann Tolley is a vocalist who recorded on the MGM Records and Jubilee Records labels in the 1950s. Among her notable songs are I'd Never Forgive Myself (1953),<ref>Pop Memories 1890-1954, Joel Whitburn, Record Research, 1986, pg. 421.</ref> I Tried Again/That's What I Like (1954) and Don't/
Baby Want You Please Come Home (1955). Although her music was once erroneously reviewed as rhythm & blues, it is considered pop music. According to Frank Sinatra biographer Kitty Kelley. Tolley had a romance with Sinatra.

Career 
Tolley toured frequently in the 1950s. In 1953 she opened at the Casa Blanca in Canton, Ohio on December 11, for three days. Afterward she performed for two weeks at the Spa Athletic Club in Erie, Pennsylvania, beginning on December 14.

Tolley appeared on the WRC-TV program, The National Radio Fan Club, on July 15, 1955. Tolley was an added attraction on a bill with Bill Haley and the Comets at the Courthouse Square Theatre in Springfield, Massachusetts, in December 1955.

References

Possibly living people
Date of birth missing (living people)
Place of birth missing (living people)
American women singers
Year of birth missing